Owen Evans is a Welsh civil servant.

Early life and education 
Owen Evans was educated at Ysgol Gyfun Gymunedol Penweddig in Aberystwyth, Wales. Evans completed his A-level in Economics in one year, and after leaving school, went on to study the subject at Swansea University, graduating in 1991.

Career 
Evans sat as a member of the Welsh Language Board from 2005 to 2010.

Evans was appointed chief executive of the Welsh-language public broadcaster S4C in October 2017.

In July 2021, it was announced that Evans would succeed Meilyr Rowlands as the head of the Welsh education inspectorate Estyn in January 2022.

References 

Living people
People from Aberystwyth
S4C
Welsh civil servants
Alumni of Swansea University
Year of birth missing (living people)